Slidell High School or Slidell School is a public high school located in Slidell, Texas (USA). It is part of the Slidell Independent School District located in far northeast Wise County and classified as a 1A school by the UIL. In 2015, the school was rated "Met Standard" by the Texas Education Agency.

Academics
UIL Academic Meet Champions 
2015(1A)

Athletics
The Slidell Greyhounds compete in these sports - 

Basketball
Cross Country
Golf
Tennis
Track and Field

State titles
Boys Basketball - 
1942(B), 1943(B), 2019(1A) 
Girls Basketball - 
1963(B)

Notable alumni
Clifton McNeely (June 22, 1919 - December 26, 2003) was an American basketball player and coach.

References

External links
Slidell ISD

Schools in Wise County, Texas
Public high schools in Texas
Public middle schools in Texas
Public elementary schools in Texas